State Route 27 (abbreviated SR 27) is part of Maine's system of numbered state highways, running  from the village of Newagen in Southport at SR 238 to the Coburn Gore-Woburn Border Crossing, where it continues into Quebec as Route 161.

SR 27 passes through the major cities, towns, and villages of Boothbay Harbor, Wiscasset, Gardiner, Augusta, the Belgrade Lakes Region, Farmington, Kingfield, and Eustis.

Route description

SR 27 begins at SR 238 in Southport and heads northeast to the town of Boothbay Harbor. It intersects SR 96, then heads north to the town of Edgecomb to US 1, where it turns left along US 1 heading into the town of Wiscasset. It intersects SR 218, and then immediately turns right and continues north to Dredsen, where it intersects SR 197. SR 27 continues north to Pittston where it intersects State Route 194 and State Route 126. SR 27 continues into Randolph where it intersects SR 226 and then turns west as SR 9 continues north to Augusta.

In Augusta, SR 27 intersects SR 24 and US 201, then intersects US 202, SR 11, SR 17 and SR 100 at a rotary. Continuing north, SR 27 leaves US 201 and turns northwest toward Belgrade. It intersects SR 105 and SR 104 before heading towards I-95 along with SR 8 and SR 11. In North Augusta, the highway intersects SR 3 and, in Sidney, intersects SR23. In Belgrade, SR 8 and SR 11 split off and SR 27 intersects SR 135 before passing through Belgrade Lakes Village.

In Rome, SR 27 intersects SR 225. It then joins US 2, enters the town of New Sharon, and intersects SR 134. In Farmington Falls, it intersects SR 41, which heads south. SR 27 then turns onto SR 4 and SR 43. The three routes then turn east toward Industry. SR 27 splits off and heads north into New Vineyard. SR 27 then joins SR 234 before entering New Portland. It then intersects SR 146 and heads north to Kingfield. It intersects SR 142 and joins SR 16. The two routes enter Carrabassett Valley, where they pass Sugarloaf Mountain. The routes then enter Stratton, where SR 16 forks to the west towards Rangeley, leaving SR 27 to head north to Eustis. The highway curves to the northeast to Coburn Gore where it crosses the border into Quebec, continuing as Quebec Route 161.

History

Major intersections

References

External links

Maine State Route log via floodgap.com

027
Transportation in Lincoln County, Maine
Transportation in Kennebec County, Maine
Transportation in Franklin County, Maine
Transportation in Somerset County, Maine